The World of Karl Pilkington is the first book written and illustrated by Karl Pilkington, and contains transcripts from The Ricky Gervais Show podcasts and excerpts from his own diary, as well as drawings and some original material illustrated by Pilkington himself. It was published and released in 2006. As stated on The Ricky Gervais Show, Karl put a lot of work into the book and had been illustrating the drawings featured in the book for a considerable amount of time. Karl had stated briefly whilst producing The Ricky Gervais Show that he had had an ambition to write a book.

References

Books by Ricky Gervais
Books by Karl Pilkington
2006 non-fiction books
HarperCollins books